Krishna Pakshakkilikal is a 2002 Indian Malayalam film, directed by K. J. Abraham Lincoln and produced by Pradeep Paliyath. The film stars Revathy, Pradeep Paliyath, Bindu Panicker and Kalabhavan Santhosh in lead roles. The film had musical score by Raveendran.

Cast

Soundtrack
The music was composed by Raveendran.

References

External links
 

2002 films
2000s Malayalam-language films